Mulena Yomuhulu Mbumu wa Litunga Mubukwanu (died c. 1840) was a High Chief of the Lozi people, King of Barotseland in Africa. He quarrelled with his brother Silumelume.

Biography

Family 
Mubukwanu was a son of the Chief Mulambwa Santulu and grandson of Chief Mwanawina I.

His younger brother was Chief Silumelume, successor of their father.

According to Mutumba Mainga, Mubukwanu was the father of Sipopa Lutangu.

Reign 
Mubukwanu wanted to be a king and he began to rule after Silumelume was killed. It is possible that Mubukwanu ordered murder of his brother.

Mubukwanu was also the 6th Chief of Nalolo, but was defeated and exiled by the Makololo, after their conquest of Barotseland. He then fled into hiding on Lipu Island. 

He was poisoned by his wife at Lukulu Fort, ca. 1840.

Children 
Mubukwanu had six sons:
Prince Alikunda
King Sipopa Lutangu
Prince Imasiku Mubukwanu
Prince Mwanawina Mubukwanu
Prince Mwangala Mubukwanu
Prince Musiwa Mubukwanu

Imasiku was proclaimed king at Lukulu Fort after death of his father, but was defeated by the Makololo and fled with his followers across the Kabompo River, settling in the Lukwakwa country.

References 

Litungas
1840 deaths
Year of death uncertain
Year of birth unknown